Arseni Sergeyevich Gritsyuk (born 15 March 2001) is a Russian professional ice hockey player for Avangard Omsk of the Kontinental Hockey League (KHL). He was selected by the New Jersey Devils in the 2019 NHL Entry Draft.

Playing career
Gritsyuk was drafted in the fifth round, 129th overall, by the New Jersey Devils in the 2019 NHL Entry Draft. He made his professional debut for Avangard Omsk during the 2020–21 season where he recorded one goal and one assist in 12 games and won the Gagarin Cup. On 30 April 2021, he signed a two-year contract extension with Avangard Omsk.

International play

Gritsyuk represented Russia at the 2019 IIHF World U18 Championships where he recorded three goals and two assists in seven games and won a silver medal. He also represented Russia at the 2021 World Junior Ice Hockey Championships where he recorded one goal and three assists in six games. He represented Russia at the 2022 Winter Olympics, winning a silver medal.

Career statistics

Regular season and playoffs

International

Awards and honours

References

External links

2001 births
Living people
Avangard Omsk players
HC Izhstal players
Metallurg Novokuznetsk players
New Jersey Devils draft picks
Russian ice hockey people
Russian ice hockey left wingers
Sportspeople from Krasnoyarsk
Ice hockey players at the 2022 Winter Olympics
Medalists at the 2022 Winter Olympics
Olympic silver medalists for the Russian Olympic Committee athletes
Olympic medalists in ice hockey
Olympic ice hockey players of Russia